Bartolommeo Tutiani was an Italian engraver on wood of the Renaissance period. He completed an engraving of Christ insulted by the Jews, printed in Augsburg in 1515.

References

Italian engravers
Renaissance artists